The David Brown Speedback is a grand tourer produced by the British car manufacturer David Brown Automotive. It is the company's first model, and was presented in April 2014 at the "Top Marques" in Monaco. The Speedback is built in Silverstone, England.

Specifications 
The Speedback is based on the all-aluminum Jaguar XKR (XK150) platform and uses its V8 engine. The twin-scroll supercharged 5.0L AJ-V8 engine has a  bore and stroke, and produces . Power is sent to the rear wheels through a 6-speed ZF automatic transmission.

The Speedback is stylistically similar to the Aston Martin DB5 and DB6 and was designed by former Jaguar Land Rover designer Alan Mobberley. The bespoke body of each Speedback GT is produced using traditional coach building methods; the aluminium body panels are hand beaten and then rolled over an english wheel. The bucks over which the panels are beaten have been milled out using a 5-axis CNC milling machine from CAD data, obtained from the full-size design clay model. 

The car is available with either 2 or 2+2 seats. In the luggage compartment there is an additional folding bench, which can be folded out to the picnic.

No more than 100 Speedback GTs will be built, priced at about £495,000.

At the 87th Geneva Motor Show in March 2017, the revised version of the Speedback GT was introduced.

Silverstone Edition 

Launched on 6 March 2018 at the Geneva International Motor Show, the Speedback Silverstone Edition is the third special edition model made by David Brown.

Limited to 10 examples globally, the Silverstone Edition is a performance-focused version of the Speedback GT, and celebrates the company's first anniversary of its move to the new Silverstone build facility and headquarters in April 2017.

The rear suspension is also updated over the existing set-up in the Speedback GT.

Each of the 10 Speedback Silverstone Edition examples will be built to the same specification, with just left-hand and right-hand drive and 2-seater or 2+2 configuration differences.

A bespoke 'Fly by Night' paint finish, applied over 8 weeks is offered on the Silverstone Edition, with a subtle, fading 'Black Night' painted stripe across the length of the body, while the interior cockpit is trimmed in 'Antique' tan leather, with brogueing and fluting to the seats, evocative of the 1960s cars and aircraft that the car is inspired by. Premium Kvadrat Remix fabrics and 'Scorched Ebony Macassar' wood veneers are also specified in the interior.

Models

Petrol engines

References 

Speedback
Grand tourers
First car made by manufacturer
Cars introduced in 2014
2020s cars
Retro-style automobiles